Kalinn "Khaos" Williams (born March 30, 1994) is an American mixed martial artist who competes in the Welterweight division of the Ultimate Fighting Championship.

Background

Williams got his first taste of knockouts in 2008 when he floored another teenager in a street fight and shook hands afterward.

In July 2013, Williams became the first graduate of a cooperative online education program between the Jackson County Sheriff's Office and Jackson Public Schools. Williams earned a high school diploma through an online program while incarcerated in Jackson County Jail after being convicted of selling cocaine. He's had a spotless probation record and has performed all his required community service.

He started training in September 2013 and had his first fight three months later. His interest in MMA started because someone saw him fight and told him that he had it. So afterwards, he found a BJJ gym and just fell in love after his first bout. He started training with Leo Aponte, his former Jackson High School teacher and current mixed martial arts coach.

Mixed martial arts career

Early career
Starting his career in 2017, Williams fought for a variety of Michigan regional promotions, including King of the Cage events held there. He obtained a 9–1 record in this time, most notably winning the Total Warrior Combat Super Lightweight Championship against 36 fight veteran Tony Hervey.

Ultimate Fighting Championship
Replacing injured Dhiego Lima on short notice, Williams made his promotional debut against Alex Morono at UFC 247 on February 8, 2020. He won the fight via first-minute knockout. This win earned him the Performance of the Night award.

Williams made his sophomore appearance in the organization against Abdul Razak Alhassan at UFC Fight Night: Felder vs. dos Anjos on November 14, 2020. He won the fight via first-minute knockout. This win earned him the Performance of the Night award.

Williams faced Michel Pereira at UFC Fight Night 183 on December 19, 2020. He lost the fight via unanimous decision.

Williams faced Matthew Semelsberger on June 19, 2021 at UFC on ESPN 25 He won the bout via unanimous decision.

Williams faced Miguel Baeza on November 13, 2021 at UFC Fight Night 197. He won the fight via technical knockout in round three. This win earned him the Performance of the Night award.

Williams faced Randy Brown on May 7, 2022 at UFC 274. He lost the fight via split decision.

Williams is scheduled to face Ronaldo Bedoya on May 6, 2023 at UFC Fight Night 225.

Personal life

He was born in Jackson, Michigan on March 20, 1994. He is the biological son of Cynthia Rodgers of Jackson and the adoptive son and biological nephew of Lillian Rodgers of Albion, Michigan.

In 2007, he was given his nickname Khaos. He grew up in a rough neighborhood and constantly created chaos. His early sparring partners also nicknamed him The Ox Fighter because he was strong as an ox.

Championships and accomplishments

Mixed martial arts
Ultimate Fighting Championship
Performance of the night (Three times) 
Total Warrior Combat
 TWC Super Lightweight (165 lb) Championship
MMAjunkie.com
2020 November Knockout of the Month

Mixed martial arts record

|-
|Loss
|align=center|13–3
|Randy Brown
|Decision (split)
|UFC 274
|
|align=center|3
|align=center|5:00
|Phoenix, Arizona, United States
|
|-
|Win
|align=center|13–2
|Miguel Baeza
|TKO (punches)
|UFC Fight Night: Holloway vs. Rodríguez
|
|align=center|3
|align=center|1:02
|Las Vegas, Nevada, United States
|
|-
|Win
|align=center|12–2
|Matthew Semelsberger
|Decision (unanimous)
|UFC on ESPN: The Korean Zombie vs. Ige 
|
|align=center|3
|align=center|5:00
|Las Vegas, Nevada, United States
|
|-
|Loss
|align=center|11–2
|Michel Pereira
|Decision (unanimous)
|UFC Fight Night: Thompson vs. Neal
|
|align=center|3
|align=center|5:00
|Las Vegas, Nevada, United States
|
|-
|Win
|align=center|11–1
|Abdul Razak Alhassan
|KO (punch)
|UFC Fight Night: Felder vs. dos Anjos
|
|align=center|1
|align=center|0:30
|Las Vegas, Nevada, United States
|
|-
|Win
|align=center|10–1
|Alex Morono
|KO (punches)
|UFC 247 
|
|align=center|1
|align=center|0:27
|Houston, Texas, United States
|
|-
|Win
|align=center|9–1
|Jeremie Holloway
|Decision (unanimous)
|WXC 84: Warrior Wednesday 9
|
|align=center|3
|align=center|5:00
|Southgate, Michigan, United States
|
|-
|Win
|align=center|8–1
|Bo Yan
|TKO (punches)
|Beijing Combat
|
|align=center|1
|align=center|0:24
|Beijing, China
|
|-
|Win
|align=center|7–1
|Ladarious Jackson
|Submission (guillotine choke)
|WXC 82: Warrior Wednesday 7
|
|align=center|1
|align=center|4:59
|Southgate, Michigan, United States
|
|-
|Win
|align=center|6–1
|Tony Hervey
|Decision (unanimous)
|TWC: Brooks vs. Robinson
|
|align=center|3
|align=center|5:00
|Lansing, Michigan, United States
|
|-
|Win
|align=center|5–1
|P.J. Cajigas
|Decision (unanimous)
|TWC: Bennett vs. Shaw
|
|align=center|3
|align=center|5:00
|Lansing, Michigan, United States
|
|-
|Win
|align=center|4–1
|J.P. Saint Louis
|KO (punch)
|KOTC: Hard Knocks 3
|
|align=center|1
|align=center|1:22
|Wyandotte, Michigan, United States
|
|-
|Loss
|align=center|3–1
|Dan Yates
|Decision (unanimous)
|KnockOut Promotions 60
|
|align=center|3
|align=center|5:00
|Grand Rapids, Michigan, United States
|
|-
|Win
|align=center|3–0
|Erick Lora-Martinez
|Decision (unanimous)
|KnockOut Promotions 59
|
|align=center|3
|align=center|5:00
|Grand Rapids, Michigan, United States
|
|-
|Win
|align=center|2–0
|Carrese Archer
|TKO (punches)
|KOTC: Second Coming
|
|align=center|2
|align=center|2:05
|Wyandotte, Michigan, United States
|
|-
|Win
|align=center|1–0
|Brandon Johnson
|TKO (punches)
|KOTC: Supremacy
|
|align=center|1
|align=center|1:59
|Wyandotte, Michigan, United States
|

See also 
 List of current UFC fighters
 List of male mixed martial artists

References

External links 
  
 

1994 births
Living people
American male mixed martial artists
Welterweight mixed martial artists
Mixed martial artists utilizing Brazilian jiu-jitsu
Ultimate Fighting Championship male fighters
Sportspeople from Jackson, Michigan
Mixed martial artists from Michigan
American practitioners of Brazilian jiu-jitsu